Alison Fell (born 1944 in Dumfries, Scotland) is a Scottish poet and novelist with a particular interest in women's roles and political victims. Her poems have appeared in many anthologies. Her children's books also pass on social messages.

Life and work
Alison Fell was educated at Dumfries Academy and Edinburgh Art College, from which she graduated as a sculptor. She began writing for Scotland Magazine in 1962. In 1967 she married a Leeds University academic and bore a son. By 1970 she had separated and she moved to London, where she co-founded the Woman's Street Theatre Group (later the Monstrous Regiment). An account of the company and Fell's life at this period appears in Michèle Roberts's memoir Paper Houses.

She worked at the underground newspaper Ink, and contributed to Spare Rib.

Fell's poems "speak for women, activists and political victims" and have been much anthologized. Her children's books Grey Dancer (1981) and The Bad Box (1987) "deal with growing up in left-wing working-class families." Kisses for Mayakovsky (1984) is a volume of them, and Every Move You Make, published in the same year, is an autobiographical novel. She also contributed about herself in Truth, Dare or Promise: Girls Growing up in the Fifties (1985, edited by Liz Heron).

In addition to her output of poetry and fiction, she held the School of English and American Studies Writing Fellowship at the University of East Anglia in 1998.

Awards
1984: Alice Hunt Bartlett Prize for Kisses for Mayakovsky
1991: Boardman Tasker Prize for Mountain Literature for Mer de Glace
2002–2003: Royal Literary Fund Fellowship

Works

Poetry

Novels

Anthology

Editor

References

External links

1944 births
Academics of the University of East Anglia
Boardman Tasker Prize winners
Living people
Scottish women poets
Scottish women novelists